Valeriu Tiron (born 8 April 1993) is a Moldovan football player who plays as a midfielder for FC Codru Lozova. He was a member of Moldova-21.

References 
 
 Valeriu Tiron at moldova.sports.md

1993 births
Living people
Moldovan footballers
Moldovan expatriate footballers
FC Botoșani players
ACS Foresta Suceava players
PFC Dobrudzha Dobrich players
FC Academia Chișinău players
FC Dinamo-Auto Tiraspol players
Speranța Nisporeni players
FC Codru Lozova players
Moldovan Super Liga players
Liga II players
Second Professional Football League (Bulgaria) players
Association football midfielders
Moldovan expatriate sportspeople in Romania
Expatriate footballers in Romania
Moldovan expatriate sportspeople in Bulgaria
Expatriate footballers in Bulgaria